The 2013 FIM eRoad Racing World Cup season was the only season of the eRoad Racing championship for electric motorcycle road racing, organised by the Fédération Internationale de Motocyclisme (FIM) following the unification of the former TTXGP series with the FIM "e-Power" electric motorcycle racing series. Two separate series were held in Europe and in North America. Since the planned World Final was cancelled, two separate winners were determined, one for each series: Ho Chi Fung (Zongshen, China) for the European series and Eric Bostrom (Icon Brammo, USA) for the North American series.

Calendar

The 2013 eRoadRacing World Cup was planned to consist of 4 races in Europe and 4 in North America, with a world final in Asia. However, only 6 races took place in the end, as two of the American races as well as the World Final had to be cancelled because of time constraints.

European series

American series

Participants

World Cup standings

Source:

European series

American series

References

eRoad Racing